Luís Gomes Sambo is an Angolan medical doctor and politician who served as Minister of Health. He is currently a member of Angolan parliament. He previously worked at the World Health Organisation (WHO) in various positions before rising to the position of Regional Director in 2005.

Education 
Sambo studied for a bachelor’s degree in medicine at the University of Angola and a diploma in Public Health at the Portuguese Medical Association. After his medical studies, he enrolled for a PhD in Management at the University of Hull, United Kingdom.

Career 
Sambo entered civil service in the ministry of health. He was Director of Health Services in Cabinda Province and later became the Director of International Cooperation department of the Ministry of Health. After this he was appointed Vice-minister of Health serving concurrently as Chair of the National Health Committee and Coordinator of Public hospitals in Luanda before being appointed Minister of Health. At international level, he served as World Health Organization's Regional Director for Africa, Director of Programme Management and Director of the Division of Health Services Development of the WHO. He and later became country representative for Guinea Bissau and chief of the Inter-Country Strategic Support Team for Southern/East African countries.

He belongs to multiple medical organizations including the Portuguese Medical Association, International Editorial Board of the Global Library of Women's Medicine and the International Society of Systems Sciences. He is currently a member of Angolan parliament.

References 

Angolan physicians
Angolan politicians
Health ministers of Angola
21st-century Angolan people
Agostinho Neto University alumni
World Health Organization officials
Members of the National Assembly (Angola)
Living people
Year of birth missing (living people)